Ada Hill Walker (1879-10 November 1955) was a British scientific illustrator, artist and flower painter based in St Andrews in Scotland who provided illustrations for the scientific publications of William M'Intosh (1838-1931).
She often signed her work as A.H.W., A.H. Walker and Ada H. Walker.

Life 
The daughter of Jessie (née Hill) and James Walker, Ada Hill Walker was an art teacher in St Andrews who with R. Smeaton Douglas co-authored A System of Brush Drawing and Design for Public Elementary Schools, a book on brush-drawing published in 1902 and for which Walker provided 15 illustrative plates. She was the younger sister of architect William Hill Walker (1875- c1955). In the 1930s she was commissioned to paint murals in the New Picture House in her native St Andrews.

Ada Hill Walker lived in St Andrews in Scotland all her life and died there in 1955.

Gallery

References

External links
 Artwork by Ada Hill Walker on Art UK

1879 births
1955 deaths
People from St Andrews
Flower artists
Scientific illustrators
Scottish women painters